James Russell Leech (November 19, 1888 – February 5, 1952) was a Republican member of the U.S. House of Representatives from Pennsylvania.

Biography
J. Russell Leech was born in Ebensburg, Pennsylvania. He attended the Mercersburg Academy, in Mercersburg, Pennsylvania. He graduated from Washington & Jefferson College in Washington, Pennsylvania, in 1911, and from the law department of the University of Pennsylvania at Philadelphia, Pennsylvania in 1915. He was admitted to the bar in 1915 and commenced practice in Ebensburg. During the First World War, he was appointed as a second lieutenant and served with the Seventh Ammunition Train.

Leech was elected as a Republican to the Seventieth, Seventy-first, and Seventy-second Congresses and served until his resignation on January 29, 1932, having been appointed a member of the United States Board of Tax Appeals (now the United States Tax Court) to fill a vacancy. He was reappointed in 1934 and again in 1946, and served on this court until his death in Chevy Chase, Maryland. Interment in Lloyd Cemetery in Ebensburg.

References
 Retrieved on 2008-02-10
The Political Graveyard

1888 births
1952 deaths
People from Ebensburg, Pennsylvania
United States Army officers
Washington & Jefferson College alumni
Pennsylvania lawyers
American military personnel of World War I
Judges of the United States Tax Court
University of Pennsylvania Law School alumni
United States Article I federal judges appointed by Herbert Hoover
20th-century American judges
Republican Party members of the United States House of Representatives from Pennsylvania
Members of the United States Board of Tax Appeals